Goubonne is a sub-prefecture of Tibesti Region in Chad.

References 

Populated places in Chad